The  (NINJAL) is an independent administrative institution in Japan, established for the purpose of studying, surveying, promoting, and making recommendations for the proper usage of the Japanese language.

The institute is located in Tachikawa City in Tokyo, Japan.

See also
 List of Independent Administrative Institutions (Japan)

References

External links
 NINJAL, web page (English)
 NINJAL,  web page (Japanese)

1948 establishments in Japan
Government agencies of Japan
Research institutes in Japan